Quicker'n a Wink is a 1940 American short documentary film in the Pete Smith Specialities series about stroboscopic photography, written by Buddy Adler and directed by George Sidney. In 1941, it won an Oscar for Best Short Subject (One-Reel) at the 13th Academy Awards.

Cast 
 Clarence Curtis (uncredited)
 Harold E. Edgerton as himself (uncredited)
 Tex Harris (uncredited)
 Charles Lacey (uncredited)
 June Preisser (uncredited)
 Pete Smith as narrator (uncredited)

References

External links 
 
 
 

1940 films
1940 documentary films
1940 short films
American black-and-white films
American short documentary films
Black-and-white documentary films
Documentary films about technology
Films produced by Pete Smith (film producer)
Films directed by George Sidney
Live Action Short Film Academy Award winners
1940s short documentary films
1940s American films